Taylor Marsh (born 1954), the pseudonym for Michelle Marshall, is an author, political analyst and strategist, and also the founder and publisher of the new media blog TaylorMarsh.com. Marsh is best known for being a "die hard Clintonite," as The Washington Post described her. However, Marsh started out skeptical of Hillary Clinton, as the National Journal's Hotline OnCall revealed early in 2007. TaylorMarsh.com became a central hub for Clinton's supporters during the 2008 primary election cycle. She was a contributor to The Huffington Post, covering SEIU events, and the AFSCME Democratic debate during 2007, and has written for several other new media sites.

Personal history and education

Marsh was born in Columbia, Missouri, but spent most of her life growing up in St. Louis, raised by her mother after her father died.

Taylor competed in the beauty pageant scene to pay for college, starting with Miss Teenage St. Louis and earning the title of "Miss Friendship" in the Miss Teenage America Pageant. Years later, she was crowned Miss Missouri, of 1974 going to the Miss America 1975 pageant.

Marsh went to Stephens College in Columbia, Missouri, a liberal arts school, on scholarship, where she performed in the modern dance troupe and as lead dancer in productions, as well as the drama department's "Sweet Charity", in the lead role of "Charity." Marsh graduated with a B.F.A. in three and one-half years.

Marsh's interest in politics began when she was a kid, through her older brother Larry R. Marshall, who was an assistant attorney general for the state of Missouri when John Ashcroft was Attorney General of Missouri. Marsh's sister, Susie, was married to the late Joseph Stephen Simon, Vice President ExxonMobil.

Professional background

Acting 
Jerry Herman cast Marsh in her very first audition that landed her in "The Grand Tour,"  with the show receiving several Tony Award nominations. Marsh also did other shows, including bit parts and acting as understudy, living in New York City for several years. Marsh was cast in numerous national and regional commercials, beginning from the time she was a teen, and extending into her time in New York, then in Los Angeles, where she lived for almost two decades.

In 2005, Marsh wrote, produced and directed “Weeping for J.F.K.” at Two Roads Theater, a one-woman show staged in Los Angeles that traced the intersection of politics, John F. Kennedy and her life, from the 1960s to the early 2000s.

Writing 
Taylor worked at the alternative newsweekly LA Weekly in the personal ad department, starting in the early 1990s, as online dating was hitting. "Relationship consultant" became her official title. Marsh was responsible for starting the first "alternative" personal ad section at the LA Weekly. In 1996, Taylor started publishing short pieces online about dating and the personals, marriage and relationships. Taylor Marsh's trademark column inside the LA Weekly was "What Do You Want?," which included mixture of dating and personal ad advice, with political opinion included periodically.

In 1997, Taylor Marsh became managing editor to one of the first sites online to make money. Marsh wrote about politics daily on "The Editor's Desk," covering the fight between Ken Starr and Susan McDougal regularly, as the Monica Lewinsky scandal unfolded. Marsh resigned from the post after about a year. She wrote about her brief experience in her memoir, My Year in Smut...

Taylor was quoted in the Los Angeles Times in a 2000 article titled "L.A.'s Long Strange Tryst with Democrats," just after the time she began freelance writing, consulting and strategizing, which lasted throughout the 2000s. The Times quoting Marsh about former Pres. Bill Clinton: "I think Clinton understands the messiness of being human. Clinton knows how bright he is, but deep in his soul he has some sexual healing that he needs to go through, that he has some sexual urges that take him in an opposite direction [from] his intellect. Whole people are messy and incongruous and terribly, terribly flawed."

Taylor Marsh began blogging online during the John Kerry primary campaign of 2004. Marsh backed Hillary Clinton in July 2007, after reporting on the candidates.

In 2009, Marsh moved to the Washington, D.C. area.

Bibliography

 Marsh's book "The Sexual Education of a Beauty Queen: Relationship Secrets from the Trenches" was published by Open Road Media in August 2014,.
 Marsh's book, "The Hillary Effect - Politics, Sexism and the Destiny of Loss," was first published as an eBook on November 14, 2011, through Premier Digital Publishing.

Media

Marsh has been interviewed by the BBC, CNN, MSNBC, C-SPAN's Washington Journal, Al Jazeera, and on the radio from coast to coast. Marsh was featured in The Hill's "The Washington Scene", covered in the National Journal's Hotline's OnCall; and quoted on NewYorkTimes.com.

References

External links
 Taylor Marsh - New media blog

1954 births
Living people
American non-fiction writers
Miss America 1975 delegates
21st-century pseudonymous writers
Pseudonymous women writers
Stephens College alumni
Writers from Missouri